Karel Škréta Šotnovský ze Závořic (1610 – 1674) was a Czech portrait painter who worked in the Baroque style. He lived through the Thirty Years' War which caused him some hardships as a Protestant which led him to leave Prague for Saxony then Italy.

Biography 
He was born to a noble Protestant family that originally operated mills in South Bohemia, but moved to Kutna Hora, then Prague, where they occupied several official positions. His father died when he was only three, and he was commended to the care of the local schools,  where he received a thorough classical education. It is uncertain where he learned painting, although he probably studied at the Royal Court, where he would have worked with Aegidius Sadeler.

During this time, the Thirty Years' War had begun and Prague was taken by Catholic forces. Protestants were tolerated at first, but a major conversion effort was initiated in 1627 and, the following year, he fled with his mother to Saxony. He eventually made his way to Italy, spent a few years in Venice studying the works of Veronese, Tintoretto and Titian, then went to Rome in 1634. While there, he joined the Bentvueghels (a Dutch painters' association) under the pseudonym "Slagzwaart" (Broadsword).

By this time, he had already established himself as a portrait painter. After about a year he went back to Saxony and finally returned to Prague in 1638, where he converted to Catholicism and sued to regain his property; possibly with the assistance of an influential Jesuit, as he had begun to accept commissions from that order. He opened a studio in 1645 and joined the artists' guild, serving as its chairman from 1651 to 1661.

In addition to his portraits, he painted altarpieces and other decorations at several churches, including the Church of Our Lady before Týn, the Church of Saint Procopius, Žižkov and St. Wenceslas Church in Zderaz. Numerous streets have been named after him; in Vinohrady, Brno, Ostrava, Olomouc, Ústí nad Labem, Jihlava, Česká Lípa, Litoměřice, Vysoké Mýto, Hořice, Lysá nad Labem, Řevnice, Žatec and Plzeň.

He is also the subject of two theatrical works (both called Karel Škréta). The second is a comic opera, based on Svoboda's play, written in 1883 by Karel Bendl, to a libretto by Eliška Krásnohorská. Although his art plays a role in the plots (especially at the climax), they feature romantic and political intrigues that end in murder.

Selected paintings

References

Further reading 
 Jaromír Neumann, Škrétové, Akropolis, 2000 
 Lenka Stolárová and Vít Vlnas, Karel Škréta (1610–1674): Doba a dílo, (exhibition catalog) Národní galerie v Praze, 2010

External links 

 Matthias Tanner: Societas Jesu Usque ad Sanguinem Pro Deo, Et Fide Christiana militans Pragae : Typis Universitatis Carolo-Ferdinandeae, in Collegio Societatis Jesu ad S. Clementem (1675?) with illustrations by Karel Škréta, Jan Jiří Heinsch and Melchior Küsel. Digitalized online  by the Moravian Library.
 ArtNet: More works by Škréta.

1610 births
1674 deaths
17th-century Bohemian people
17th-century painters
Baroque painters
Czech painters
Czech male painters
Czech portrait painters
Czech baroque painters
Members of the Bentvueghels
Czech expatriates in Germany
Czech expatriates in Italy
Artists from Prague